Mogumber may refer to

 Mogumber Nature Reserve, a protected area near Moore River, Western Australia
 Mogumber, Western Australia, a small rural settlement in the Shire of Victoria Plains, located on the site of the former Mogumber Native Mission
 Moore River Native Settlement, also known as Mogumber Native Mission
 Darwinia carnea, a plant species commonly known as Mogumber bell